Germany was one of seven countries to enter the Eurovision Song Contest 1956, the first Eurovision Song Contest to be held. The German broadcaster ARD held a national final to select two entries to represent the country: Walter Andreas Schwarz with "" and Freddy Quinn with "". Neither song won the 1956 Contest, held in Lugano, Switzerland.

Before Eurovision

National final
The German national final was held on 1 May 1956 and was presented by Heinz Piper. Two songs were selected for the Eurovision Song Contest 1956.

There was a rumour that Lys Assia performed the song "" in the national final. However, this turned out to be incorrect, as she remembered only that she took part with a song of that title in a German music festival - it turned out that she competed with this song in the German Schlager Festival of 1961.

At Eurovision
The rules of the 1956 edition of the Eurovision Song Contest allowed two songs per country for the only time in Eurovision history, with the two songs from each of seven countries performing via two rounds at the same order of countries. Both entries were conducted by host Switzerland's Fernando Paggi. "" was performed fourth and "" eleventh, both following Belgium and preceding France's two songs. The scoreboard of the 1956 Contest has never been made public, making any statements about placing and points impossible. However, there is considerable speculation that "" placed second, after Switzerland. The two entries were succeeded as German representative at the 1957 contest by Margot Hielscher with "".

References

External links
 Official Eurovision Song Contest site, history by year
 Detailed info & lyrics for "Im Wartesaal zum großen Glück", Diggiloo Thrush
 Detailed info & lyrics for "So geht das jede Nacht", Diggiloo Thrush

1956
Countries in the Eurovision Song Contest 1956
Eurovision